The Panasonic Leica D Vario-Elmarit 14-50mm F2.8-3.5 ASPH Mega OIS is an interchangeable camera lens announced by Panasonic on February 26, 2006. It was the first Leica lens with optical image stabilisation.

Popular Photography praised the lens' "superior sharpness and distortion control" while Camera Labs additionally emphasised the "superior build quality".

References

14-050mm F2.8-3.5 ASPH Mega OIS
Camera lenses introduced in 2006